Karmin was a musical duo from Boston, Massachusetts.

Karmin may also refer to:

People
 Mati Karmin (born 1959), Estonian architect

Places
 Karmin, Kościan County in Greater Poland Voivodeship (west-central Poland)
 Karmin, Pleszew County in Greater Poland Voivodeship (west-central Poland)
 Karmin, Szamotuły County in Greater Poland Voivodeship (west-central Poland)